Historic Longstreet Farm is a living history farm in Holmdel, New Jersey. The farm is only 9 of 664 acres within Holmdel Park. In 2021, Holmdel Park received 1,096,379 visitors, while Longstreet Farm received 102,522 visitors. It is operated by the Monmouth County Park System. Today, the farm is a recreation of rural life in Monmouth County as it was the 1890s. Staff dresses in period clothing, while performing the daily and seasonal agricultural and domestic activities of a resident of the time period, such as planting and harvesting of crops, taking caring of the livestock, etc. Admission and parking are free.

The farm is open all year from 10am to 4pm, with extended hours from Memorial Day through Labor Day. The farm offers multiple activities for children through various programs, summer camps and events. The farmhouse is open weekends and holidays from March to December from 12pm to 3:30pm. Across the street, there is the Tenant House, which housed the workers of a tenant family and is today used for staff offices. The Holmes-Hendrickson House, built in 1754, is a museum operated by the Monmouth County Historical Association.

References 

Farms in New Jersey
Holmdel Township, New Jersey